Shubham Kapse (born 22 July 1994) is an Indian cricketer. He made his first-class debut for Vidarbha in the 2017–18 Ranji Trophy on 25 November 2017.

References

External links
 

1994 births
Living people
Indian cricketers
Place of birth missing (living people)
Vidarbha cricketers